Senator Waring may refer to:

George D. Waring (1819–1893), Wisconsin State Senate
Jim Waring (born 1967), Arizona State Senate